The United States census of 1910, conducted by the Census Bureau on April 15, 1910, determined the resident population of the United States to be 92,228,496, an increase of 21 percent over the 76,212,168 persons enumerated during the 1900 census. The 1910 census switched from a portrait page orientation to a landscape orientation.

Census questions

The 1910 census collected the following information:

 address
 name
 relationship to head of family
 sex
 race
 age
 marital status and, if married, number of years of present marriage
 for women, number of children born and number now living
 place of birth and mother tongue of person, and their parents
 if foreign born, year of immigration; whether naturalized; whether able to speak English and, if unable, language spoken
 occupation, industry and class of worker
 if an employee, whether out of work during year
 literacy
 school attendance
 whether home owned or rented, and, if owned, whether mortgaged
 whether farm or house
 whether a survivor of Union or Confederate Army or Navy
 whether blind, deaf, or dumb

Full documentation for the 1910 census, including census forms and enumerator instructions, is available from  the Integrated Public Use Microdata Series.

Column titles

The column titles in the census form are as follows:

LOCATION.
Street, avenue, road, etc.
House number (in cities or towns).
1. Number of dwelling house in order of visitation.
2. Number of family in order of visitation.

3. NAME of each person whose place of abode on April 15, 1910, was in this family.

Enter surname first, then the given name and middle initial, if any.

Include every person living on April 15, 1910. Omit children born since April 15, 1910.

RELATION.

4. Relationship of this person to the head of the family.

PERSONAL DESCRIPTION.

5. Sex.

6. Color or race.

7. Age at last birthday.

8. Whether single, married, widowed, or divorced.

9. Number of years of present marriage.

10. Mother of how many children: Number born.

11. Mother of how many children: Number now living.

NATIVITY.

Place of birth of each person and parents of each person enumerated. If born in the United States, give the state or territory. If of foreign birth, give the country.

12. Place of birth of this Person.

13. Place of birth of Father of this person.

14. Place of birth of Mother of this person.

CITIZENSHIP.

15. Year of immigration to the United States.

16. Whether naturalized or alien.

17. Whether able to speak English; or, if not, give language spoken.

OCCUPATION.

18. Trade or profession of, or particular kind of work done by this person, as spinner, salesman, laborer, etc.,

19. General nature of industry, business, or establishment in which this person works, as cotton mill, dry goods store, farm, etc.

20. Whether as employer, employee, or work on own account.

If an employee –
21. Whether out of work on April 15, 1910.

22. Number of weeks out of work during year 1909.

EDUCATION.

23. Whether able to read.

24. Whether able to write.

25. Attended school any time since September 1, 1909.

OWNERSHIP OF HOME.

26. Owned or rented.

27. Owned free or mortgaged.

28. Farm or house.

29. Number of farm schedule.

30. Whether a survivor of the Union or Confederate Army or Navy.

31. Whether blind (both eyes).

32. Whether deaf and dumb.

State rankings

City rankings

First language of the foreign-born population

Data availability

The original census enumeration sheets were microfilmed by the Census Bureau in the 1940s; after which the original sheets were destroyed. The microfilmed census is available in rolls from the National Archives and Records Administration. Several organizations also host images of the microfilmed census online, along with digital indices.

Microdata from the 1910 census are freely available through the Integrated Public Use Microdata Series. Aggregate data for small areas, together with electronic boundary files, can be downloaded from the National Historical Geographic Information System.

Notes

External links

 1911 U.S Census Report Contains 1910 census results
 Historic US Census data

United States Census, 1910
United States census
United States